Cannabis in Ghana is illegal without license from the Minister of Health, but the nation is, along with Nigeria, among the top illicit cannabis-producing countries of West Africa. Cannabis in Ghana is known as weed or devil's tobacco (obonsam tawa).

History
There are two main theories as to how cannabis came to Ghana:
 Brought there by troops returning from India and Burma after World War II
 Spread by sailors coming down the coast, most likely from Sierra Leone

The first report of illegal cannabis cultivation in Ghana occurred in 1960.

Culture
Cannabis remains the most popular illegal drug in Ghana. Ghana is reported as the highest cannabis-using nation in Africa, and third in the world.

In the 1990s, cannabis which had previously been an urban phenomenon in bars and nightclubs, had spread to rural areas as well. Cannabis was associated with youth involved in Rastafari culture, and with students who believed cannabis use would improve their ability to study.

Economy
Cannabis from Ghana is transported to other countries in western Africa, as well as to Europe.

References

Ghana
Drugs in Ghana